Lucia Quinney Mee BEM (28 May 1999 – 24 May 2020) was a Northern Irish campaigner for organ donation, having had four liver transplants herself, the first at the age of eight. She took part in the 2016 Transplant Games. She started the Live Loudly Donate Proudly campaign.

References

External links 
http://live-loudly-donate-proudly.org/index.php/author/lucia-mee/

Recipients of the British Empire Medal
Charity fundraisers (people)
1999 births
2020 deaths
Year of birth uncertain
Place of death missing
Place of birth missing
People from Ballycastle, County Antrim
21st-century women from Northern Ireland
Women activists from Northern Ireland
Liver transplant recipients